"Free" is a song by American singer Mýa. It served as the third and final single from her second studio album, Fear of Flying (2000), in December 2000. Originally featured on the soundtrack to the 2000 film Bait, the song was one of the two tracks added to the re-release edition of Fear of Flying on November 7, 2000. It was written and composed by Jimmy Jam, Harrison, Terry Lewis, Alexander Richbourg, and Tony Tolbert. Lyrically, "Free" addresses on independence.

The song received generally mixed reviews from contemporary music critics, musically comparing it to Janet Jackson’s third studio album Control (1986). "Free" underperformed on Billboards US Hot 100; peaking and spending two non-consecutive weeks at number 42. It was the second single by Harrison that failed to reach the coveted Top 40. It performed even worse on Billboards component Hot R&B/Hip-Hop Singles & Tracks chart peaking at a moderately low number 52. Internationally, the single reached the top five in Australia and top 20 in the United Kingdom. The song's accompanying music video was filmed by director Dave Meyers. Harrison incorporates various dance routines throughout the video, choreographed by Brian "Footwork" Green, which won him an ACA (American Choreographer's Award) in 2001.

Background and composition
Before being added to the re-release edition of Fear of Flying, "Free" was initially released as the first single to feature film Bait (2000) starring Jamie Foxx.

Co-written by Mýa, "Free" is in the key of B minor. The song's tempo is set at a moderate dance beat at 112 beats per minute in common time. Harrison's vocal range span from a  F3 to D5. The lyrics of "Free" are composed in the traditional verse-chorus form. Mýa opens the song with brief spoken lyrics. She begins the first verse, followed by the chorus leading her into the second verse. The song continues to the bridge, chorus, then fades out with Mýa's chant.

Critical reception
Free garnered mixed to positive reviews. Chuck Taylor from Billboard compared the song to production duo Jimmy Jam & Terry Lewis earlier work with Janet Jackson and added: "Free" is all about being a strong, self-sufficient, independent woman—a nearly ubiquitous theme these days among female artists (check out currents songs by Destiny’s Child, Kandi, and Chanté Moore). But what comes across strongest in this song is the trademark Jimmy Jam/Terry Lewis sound. As a matter of fact, the track practically rips off what we know as the Janet Jackson style, with Mýa’s fragile voice possessing many of the same qualities as Janet’s. Acknowledging, "Free" is just a little too girly pop-sounding, even for the pop audience out there today." NME gave the song a mixed review and rated the single four out of ten stars writing, "R&B's enduring (annoying?) cutesy pie has done the double. Released a single that ties in with her butter wouldn't melt image -how else to you explain the lyrics, "I'm me/single, sexy and free"? Yes, make no mistake, this is Mýa trapped in Lolita land (check out the video below) not sure if she's the insolent girlfriend  ('Case of the Ex') or, as this track would paint her, a pre-teen with no idea of her temptation, but aware that she  has 'something about her'. Musically, this is right up Janet Jackson's old alley - more so before Janet found 'Control' and became obsessed with sex. So, if you're a chick who's so cute you turn yourself on, but still a virgin, this is your anthem. But of course, you'll be singing it to yourself, cos you love yourself so darn much, won't ya?! Writing for Yahoo! Music UK, Cyd Jaymes described "Free" as a mighty, bass-laden funky R&B groove with hints of Janet Jackson, Destiny's Child and J.Lo which should steam up many a window.

Chart performance
In the United States, for the issue dated week of February 3, 2001, "Free" was Billboard's Hot 100 “Hot Shot Debut” of the week debuting at number 76.  In its third week it ascended from 74-61 issue dated week of February 17, 2001. The song reached its peak at number 41 in its fourth week ascending from 61-41 issue dated week of February 24, 2001. It spent a total of 17 consecutive weeks on the chart. It was the second single released by Harrison to miss the coveted pop Top 40. On Billboards Hot R&B/Hip-Hop Singles & Tracks chart the song failed to achieve success; peaking at a moderately low fifty-two issue dated week of December 28, 2000.

Despite its chart placements in the U.S., "Free" was moderately successful in international territories. In Australia, "Free" became her second Top Ten (solo) third overall, it debuted at number 11 during the week of June 3, 2001. It reached its peak at number four in its sixth week during the week of July 8, 2001. It spent a total of 21 consecutive weeks altogether on the chart and was certified platinum by Australian Recording Industry Association for shipments of 70,000 units sold. It found success in the UK where it became her fifth Top 20 hit, it debuted and peaked at number 11 during the week of June 9, 2001. It spent a total of 6 consecutive weeks on the chart.

Music video
The music video for "Free" was directed by Dave Meyers. Harrison explained to LAUNCH how  involved she was in the making of "Free" speaking on following: the roller-skating, party dances, locking and Waacking were actually of all her concepts. Harrison got together with an underground dancer/choreographer named Brian Green (a.k.a. Brian " Footwork " Green ), and they put it together on their own. Mýa revealed it was a struggle and a fight working with someone underground because he's not established, but continued by saying that was the best thing about making "Free" because I knew him and what he had to offer and it was great. "Free" premiered on MTV's TRL and BET's 106 & Park on November 16, 2000.

Track listings

German CD single 
  Free (Jimmy Jam & Terry Lewis Video Edit) – 4:08   
  Free (Milk & Sugar Club Mix) – 7:38

German Remix 12-inch single and vinyl single 
A1  Free (Milk & Sugar Club Remix) – 7:38   
A2  Free (Milk & Sugar Club Instrumental) – 7:38   
B1  Free (Milk & Sugar Vocal Dub) – 5:52   
B2  Free (Milk & Sugar Dub Instrumental) – 5:52

Germany 12-inch single 
A1  Free (Jimmy Jam & Terry Lewis Version) – 5:21   
A2  Free (Ricco Version) – 4:11   
B1  Free (Howard Cross Version) – 3:14   
B2  Free (Instrumental) – 4:11

Germany maxi-single
  Free (Jimmy Jam & Terry Lewis Video Edit) – 4:08   
  Free (Ricco Version) – 4:11   
  Free (Milk & Sugar Radio Mix) – 3:23   
  Free (Howard & Cross Version) –  3:14   
  Free (Jimmy Jam & Terry Lewis Version) – 5:21   
  Free (Milk & Sugar Club Mix) –  7:38

U.S. 12-inch single and vinyl single
A1  Free (Jimmy Jam & Terry Lewis Version) – 5:21   
A2  Free (Ricco Version) – 4:11   
B1  Free (Howard Cross Version) – 3:14   
B2  Free (Instrumental) – 4:11

European maxi-single
  Free – 5:21   
  Free (X.Men Vocal Mix)  –  4:19   
  Free (Ricco Version)  –  4:11   
  Free (Video CD-ROM)

UK 12-inch single and vinyl single
A1  Free (X.Men Vocal Mix)  –  4:19   
A2  Free (Milk & Sugar Club Mix)  –   7:38   
B1  Free (X.Men Dub)  –  4:56   
B2  Free (Milk & Sugar Dub)

UK 12-inch single and vinyl singlee
A1  Free (Original Mix)  
A2  Free (Ricco Version)     
B  Free (X-Men Vocal Mix)

Australia maxi-single and enhanced CD
  Free (Album Version) – 5:16   
  Free (Milk & Sugar Mix) – 3:23   
  Free (Howard & Cross Version) – 4:20   
  Case Of The Ex (Mýa Remix) – 3:31   
  Free (Milk & Sugar Club Mix) – 7:28   
  Free (Milk & Sugar Club Mix Instrumental) – 7:28   
  Video  Free

Credits and personnel
 Produced by: Jimmy Jam and Terry Lewis
 Co-produced by: "Big Jim" Wright
 Engineered & Mixed by: Steve Hodge
 Assistant Engineers: Brad Yost, Xavier Smith

Charts

Weekly charts

Year-end charts

Certifications

Release history

References

2000 singles
2000 songs
Interscope Records singles
Mýa songs
Song recordings produced by Jimmy Jam and Terry Lewis
Songs with feminist themes
Songs written by Alexander Richbourg
Songs written by Jimmy Jam and Terry Lewis
Songs written by Mýa